Juan Delgado may refer to:

 Juan Delgado (fencer) (1896–1974), Spanish fencer
 Juan Delgado (footballer, born 1992), Honduran football midfielder
 Juan Delgado (Chilean footballer) (born 1993)
 Juan Delgado (Spanish footballer) (born 1994)
 Juan Delgado (Uruguayan footballer) (born 1891)

See also:
 Juanma (footballer born 1977) , Spanish retired footballer born Juan Manuel Delgado Moreno
 Juanma (footballer, born 1990), Spanish footballer born Juan Manuel Delgado Lloria